Tân Châu is a town (thị xã) of An Giang province in the Mekong Delta region of Vietnam. As of 2009 the town had a population of 184,129. The town covers an area of 175.68 km².

It is famous for Tân Châu silk with the famous product Lãnh Mỹ A, whose black colour comes from the Diospyros mollis's fruit (Vietnamese: Mặc nưa).

Tân Châu was formed in 1757. Tân Châu District was the largest province of Châu Đốc, but was divided in 1929 (with Hong Ngự District) and 1968 (separated from part of Tân Phú district). Tân Châu district is now a separate district part of An Giang Province. It was upgraded to town status in 2009 and has a population of 184,129.

References

Districts of An Giang province
County-level towns in Vietnam